Armengol is a surname.

People 
Notable people with the surname include:
Francina Armengol (born 1971), Spanish politician
Joan Armengol (d. 2020), Andorran attorney and politician
Josep M. Armengol (born 1977), Spanish literary scholar and researcher in the field of gender and masculinity studies
Jorge Lozano Armengol (born 1948), Mexican politician
Lali Armengol (born 1945), Spanish playwright, professor and theater director
Luis Antonio Martínez Armengol (born 1952), Mexican politician
Margarita Armengol (born 1960), Spanish swimmer 
Maria Antonia Armengol (born 1950), Spanish politician
Maria Teresa Armengol, Andorran politician
Mario Ruiz Armengol (1914–2002), Mexican pianist, composer, arranger, conductor and music teacher
Pedro Armengol ( – 1304), Spanish Roman Catholic saint
Vicente Mut Armengol (1614–1687), Mallorcan astronomer, engineer, historian, mathematician and soldier

Catalan-language surnames